Murray Valley may refer to:

 Electoral district of Murray Valley
 Murray River valley
 Murray Valley Highway
 Murray Valley National Park
 Murray Valley encephalitis virus